Ribes petraeum, the rock currant, rock redcurrant, or Bieberstein's rock currant is a species of Ribes found in Europe.

References

External links
 
 

petraeum
Taxa named by Franz Xaver von Wulfen